Renishaw plc is a British engineering company based in Wotton-under-Edge, England. The company's products include coordinate-measuring machines and machine tool products. It is listed on the London Stock Exchange and is a constituent of the FTSE 250 Index.

History
The company was founded by Sir David McMurtry and John Deer in 1973. McMurtry had needed to measure fuel pipes on a prototype jet engine: at the time, coordinate-measuring machine sensors featured rigid styli, which required manual positioning on the surface and which yielded poor repeatability when measuring delicate components.  To meet this need, McMurtry invented a touch-trigger probe device, which he then patented. The probe featured an elegant 'kinematic' location for a spring-loaded stylus, providing a highly repeatable seated position for the stylus combined with the compliance needed to measure such components.

Renishaw was first listed on the London Stock Exchange in November 1984. In 2006 the Company bought 'itp', a German manufacturer of precision styli. In early 2009 the global recession reached Renishaw, resulting in a large proportion of the workforce being placed "at risk".

In 2010 Renishaw bought a stake (and subsequently took complete control) of Measuring Devices Ltd, a company providing a range of services in the field of surveying equipment. In 2011 Renishaw purchased the 400,000 sq ft Bosch plant in Miskin, Wales.

Operations
The company's product portfolio includes touch probes for CNC machine tools, calibration systems that optimise the performance of CNC machinery, linear encoder systems, rotary encoder systems, additive manufacturing machines, dental CAD/CAM systems, Raman spectroscopy and medical devices for functional neurosurgery applications.

Locations
Renishaw's main offices are situated in Gloucestershire in an old watermill, with several new buildings on a  site.  The company has a machine shop located at Stonehouse, Gloucestershire, and an assembly facility at Woodchester, both near Stroud. There are further assembly facilities in Dublin (Ireland) and Pune (India). Renishaw also has research facilities located in Wotton-under-Edge, Edinburgh and Ljubljana.

Sale of Renishaw
On 2 March 2021, David McMurtry and John Deer indicated that they wished to dispose of their entire holdings in Renishaw, comprising some 53% of the shares, as 'we recognise that neither of us is getting any younger'.  The Renishaw board then announced that it was launching a formal sale process for the entire company. This process was terminated on 7 July 2021, the board concluding that none of the proposals met their objectives.

References

External links
Official site

Engineering companies of the United Kingdom
Companies listed on the London Stock Exchange
Companies based in Stroud, Gloucestershire
Technology companies established in 1973
Wotton-under-Edge
1973 establishments in England